Björn Nilsson (born 8 April 1960) is a Swedish former footballer who played as a midfielder.

References

External links

1960 births
Association football midfielders
Swedish footballers
Sweden international footballers
Swedish expatriate footballers
Allsvenskan players
Swiss Super League players
Malmö FF players
Landskrona BoIS players
BSC Young Boys players
Expatriate footballers in Switzerland
Living people
Footballers from Malmö